Events from the year 1984 in Sweden

Incumbents
 Monarch – Carl XVI Gustaf
 Prime Minister – Olof Palme

Events
5 May – Herreys won the XXIX Eurovision Song Contest, held in Luxembourg, with the song Diggi-Loo Diggi-Ley , being the second Swedish victory.
9 July – Yvonne Riding is elected Miss Universe in Miami, USA, being the third and last Swedish victory.
Midyear – Murder of Catrine da Costa
12 October – The Man from Majorca released
29 October – Åke and His World released
14 December – Ronia, the Robber's Daughter released

Births
 
12 February – Alexandra Dahlström, actress
14 February – Eva Berglund, swimmer
14 March – Evelina Samuelsson, ice hockey player
8 May – Andreas Mokdasi, athlete
30 May – Johan Eklund, football player
3 July – Sofia Bleckur, cross-country skier
16 August – Patrik Flodin, rally driver
27 August – Hans Olsson, alpine skier.
26 September – Danijela Rundqvist, ice hockey player 
25 October – Sara Lumholdt, singer

Deaths
26 April – Axel Larsson, wrestler (born 1901).
9 June – Eric Persson, footballer (born 1898)
23 September – Clarence Blum, sculptor (born 1897)
28 October – Knut Nordahl, footballer (born 1920)

See also
 1984 in Swedish television

References

 
Sweden
Years of the 20th century in Sweden